The 2018–19 season was Lori FC's first season in the Armenian Premier League since their reestablishment in March 2017. They finished the season 5th in the league and were runners up to Alashkert in the Armenian Cup.

Season events
On 13 December 2018, Armen Adamyan resigned as manager, with Artur Petrosyan being appointed as his successor on 25 December 2018. On 12 May, Petrosyan resigned with Vahe Gevorgyan being appointed as Caretaker Manager.

Ahead of Lori's Armenian Cup semifinal second leg on 22 April, Banants owner, Jevan Cheloian, removed his team from the pitch prior to kick-off in protest of the appointment of Gevorg Eghoyan as referee.

Squad

Out on loan

Transfers

In

Loans in

Loans out

Released

Competitions

Armenian Premier League

Result summary

Results

Table

Armenian Cup

Final

Statistics

Appearances and goals

|-
|colspan="14"|Players away on loan:

|-
|colspan="14"|Players who left Lori during the season:

|}

Goal scorers

Clean sheets

Disciplinary Record

References

Lori FC seasons
Lori